Parliamentary elections were held in Portugal on 6 October 1901, the third in three years. The result was a victory for the Regeneration Party, which won 100 seats.

Results

The results exclude seats from overseas territories.

References

Legislative elections in Portugal
Portugal
1901 elections in Portugal
October 1901 events